Alderley is an unincorporated community located in the town of Ashippun, Dodge County, Wisconsin, United States. The community was named by early settlers for Alderley Edge, England.

Notes

Unincorporated communities in Dodge County, Wisconsin
Unincorporated communities in Wisconsin